Menon is a surname of the Nair community of Kerala, India, and is an honorific hereditary title, often used as an affix to one's name, bestowed by the various kings of Kerala (including the Zamorin) to the members of Nair subcastes. The recipient of the title held it lifelong, and the male members of the family held it in perpetuity along the matrilineal line.

Historically, the Menons were feudal landlords or Naduvazis, and were often engaged in various administrative and political duties, such as being ministers, accountants and advisors in the service of the kings of Kerala. Many members of the Menon subcaste are related to the rulers of the Kingdom of Cochin. Furthermore, members of the Cochin royal family were often married to aristocratic Menon families. Thus, the children of such Maharajahs held the Menon title and passed it to subsequent generations.

Many royal families also emerged from this subcaste. The famous Paliath Achans from the Paliam Royal family of Cochin, the Walluvanad royal family and the Shekhari Varmas Palakkad Royal family, all belong to this subcaste.

References

Nair
Titles in India